Biryuch is a rural locality (a selo) and the administrative center of Biryuchanskoye Rural Settlement, Valuysky District, Belgorod Oblast, Russia. The population was 221 as of 2010. There are 4 streets.

Geography 
Biryuch is located 32 km west of Valuyki (the district's administrative centre) by road. Dubrovka is the nearest rural locality.

References 

Rural localities in Valuysky District